Jógvan Heinason (1541–1602) was Lawman (prime minister) of the Faroe Islands from 1572 to 1583.

Jógvan Heinason was the son of the Norwegian priest Heine Havreki and a Faroese women, Herborg from Húsavík. The son of Jógvan Heinason's Norwegian step mother, and half brother, was the Faroe Islands' most famous seafarer, Magnus Heinason.

References

G.V.C. Young's textbook Færøerne - fra vikingetiden til reformationen, 1982
Løgtingið 150 - Hátíðarrit. Tórshavn 2002, Bind 2, S. 366. (Avsnitt Føroya løgmenn fram til 1816) (PDF-Download)

1541 births
1602 deaths
Lawmen of the Faroe Islands
16th-century Norwegian people